Ramón Fernando García (born March 15, 1972 in El Carmen, Santander) is a retired male professional road racing cyclist from Colombia.

Career

1996
3rd in Stage 5 Clásico RCN, Ibagué (COL)
1999
2nd in Stage 14 Vuelta a Colombia, Zipaquirá (COL)

References
 

1972 births
Living people
Colombian male cyclists
Sportspeople from Santander Department
20th-century Colombian people